Banjički Vis Military Base ( / Aerobaza Banjički Vis)  is a heliport located on Banjica hill about 5 kilometres (3 miles) south of downtown Belgrade (Terazije).

Airports in Serbia
Heliports in Serbia